The 2008 Tour of Qatar was held from 27 January to 1 February 2008 in Qatar. It is a multiple stage road cycling race that took part over six stages with a total of 712.5 kilometres and is part of the 2007–08 UCI Asia Tour.

Stage summary

Other leading top threes

Men's top 10 overall

References
 Official site
 Cyclingnews.com 2008 Tour of Qatar

Tour of Qatar
Tour of Qatar
Tour of Qatar